Prince Anikita Ivanovich Repnin (tr. ; 1668 – 3 July 1726, in Riga) was a prominent Russian general during the Great Northern War who superintended the taking of Riga in 1710 and served as the Governor of Livonia from 1719 until his death.

Coming from the great Repnin family, Anikita was one of the collaborators of Peter the Great, with whom he grew up. On the occasion of the Sophian insurrection of 1689, he carefully guarded Peter in the Troitsa monastery, and subsequently took part in the Azov expedition, during which he was raised to the grade of general. He took part in all the principal engagements of the Great Northern War. Defeated by Charles XII at Holowczyn, he was degraded to the ranks, but was pardoned as a reward for his valour at Lesnaya and recovered all his lost dignities. At Poltava he commanded the centre. 

From Ukraine he was transferred to the Baltic Provinces and was made the first Governor-General of Riga after its capture in 1710. In 1724 he succeeded the temporarily disgraced favorite, Menshikov, as war minister. Catherine I made him a field-marshal.

Marriage and Children  

He married twice and had 3 sons and one daughter, including 
Vasily Anikitovich Repnin (1696–1748), commander in chief of the Russian Army during the War of the Austrian Succession.

Honours
 : Order of the White Eagle

References

Field marshals of Russia
Rurikids
1668 births
1726 deaths
Recipients of the Order of the White Eagle (Poland)